Frank Finley Ledford Jr. (April 22, 1934 – May 15, 2019) was an American orthopedic surgeon who served as the 37th Surgeon General of the United States Army from 1988 to 1992.

Biography

Background and education
He was born in April 1934 in Jacksonville, Florida.  He attended college at the University of Dayton and received his bachelor's degree in 1955. That university later awarded him the Distinguished Alumni Award for his becoming the army surgeon general. In 1959, he received an M.D. degree from the University of Cincinnati College of Medicine.  Later he did residency training in orthopedic surgery.  Ledford was board certified by the American Board of Orthopedic Surgery. He is also a Fellow of the American College of Surgeons.

Service in the United States Army
Ledford has held positions as a Clinical Professor at the Uniformed Services University of the Health Sciences (USUHS), the medical school operated by the armed forces and at the University of Texas Health Science Center at San Antonio.

Culminating a long career in the U.S. Army Medical Corps, he was appointed the Surgeon General of the United States Army from June 16, 1988 to June 18, 1992. At the time, he had attained the rank of lieutenant general.

His tenure as Surgeon General came at the time of the Gulf War, when Allied forces liberated the Kuwait after Iraq invaded the country in 1991. This period was marked by apprehension over the threat of Iraqi forces using its known stock of nerve gas and possible use of biological weapons against Allied forces. This period was also marked by the difficulties in organizing military medical assets to the Persion Gulf region, which led to calling of reservists in the United States. Many of these reservists, which were physicians with private practices, were forced to temporarily close their practices and perform what they thought were mundane duties, such as doing physical examinations in U.S. bases. The thought that they were needlessly called led to some physician reservists leaving the Army reserve.

Ledford was stationed at numerous Army posts including, but not limited to, Fort Belvoir, VA (near Washington, DC), Fort Sam Houston (San Antonio, TX), Walter Reed Army Medical Center (Washington, DC), Fort Riley, KS, and Landstuhl Regional Medical Center (Germany). He was hospital commander of Irwin Army Hospital (now Irwin Army Community Hospital) in Fort Riley, Kansas in 1979 following then Col. William Winkler.

Career after serving as Surgeon General
Later, Ledford retired from the Army.  He was president of the Southwest Foundation for Biomedical Research (SFBR) in San Antonio, Texas until his retirement in May, 2005 after 13 years with the foundation. The SFBR is an independent medical research institution with close ties, but a separate administration, with the University of Texas Health Science Center at San Antonio. As such, he was a member of the board of the Texas Research Foundation and is pictured seated on the far right of the photo of the board. photo 

Ledford died after a short illness on May 15, 2019.

Awards and decorations

Miscellany
Ledford is licensed to practice medicine in Ohio, but not in Texas.
He has a daughter
He was a donor to the Sunshine Cottage School for Deaf Children having given a donation in 2005.

Support for Physician Assistants
Ledford has been a strong supporter of the physician assistant (PA) profession. He was a driving force behind Army PAs becoming commissioned officers, whereas they had originally been warrant officers. He also created the Lieutenant General Frank Ledford Award, annually recognizing the most outstanding post-graduate US Army PA who successfully completes a PhD or DSc program and engages in research. The recipients of the Award have included the following:

2011 - MAJ Jonathan Saxe
2012 - MAJ Colin Dunderdale, DSc, PA-C
2013 - MAJ D. Alan Nelson, MPAS, PhD
2014 - CPT Joseph T. Costello, DSc, PA-C
2015 - MAJ Benjamin K. Kocher, DSc, PA-C
2016 - MAJ Kurt Fossum, MPAS, DSc
2017 - LTC Matthew Douglas, DSc, PA-C
2018 - MAJ James Huang, DSc, PA-C

References

2019 deaths
1934 births
People from Jacksonville, Florida
Burials at Fort Sam Houston National Cemetery
Military personnel from Florida
Recipients of the Distinguished Service Medal (US Army)
Recipients of the Meritorious Service Medal (United States)
Recipients of the Legion of Merit
University of Dayton alumni
University of Cincinnati College of Medicine alumni
Physicians from Florida
Surgeons General of the United States Army